Elections to Rugby Borough Council were held on Thursday 22 May 2014.

14 seats were contested in this election, the first since the whole council was elected in 2012 following a boundary review. The Conservative Party retained their majority at that election. In multi-member seats, the councillor elected with the fewest votes in 2012 was up for re-election.

Election results

Ward Results

References
Statement of Nominations Rugby Borough Council

2014 English local elections
2014
2010s in Warwickshire